The men's K-4 1000 metres event was a fours kayaking event conducted as part of the Canoeing at the 1964 Summer Olympics programme on Lake Sagami, Japan. This event debuted at these games and is only one of two events that has been at every ICF Canoe Sprint World Championships (the other is the women's K-2 500 m event which made its Olympic debut at the previous Games in Rome).

The preliminary heats were held on 20 October 1964; 15 crews entered and were split into two heats of 8 and 7 fours.  The top three placers in each heat advanced to the semifinal, while the remaining eight crews (1 had withdrawn without starting in the heats) had to compete in repechage heats held the same day.  There were two repechage heats and three crews to advance from each, resulting in two boats being eliminated in the repechages.  Three semifinals, each with four crews, were held, with the top three in each heat to advance to the final and three more teams eliminated. The final was held on 22 October.

Medalists

Results

Heats
The 15 crews first raced in two heats on 20 October.  The top three finishers from each of the heats advanced directly to the semifinals; one was eliminated due to not starting, and the remaining 8 teams were relegated to the repechage heats.

Repechages
Three of the four competitors in each of the two repechages advanced to the semifinals.

Semifinals
The top three finishers in each of the three semifinals (raced on 21 October) advanced to the final.  All other teams were eliminated.

Final
The final was held on 22 October.

References
1964 Summer Olympics official report Volume 2, Part 1. pp. 248–9.
International Canoe Federation historical results to 2006 (Olympic and world for all disciplines).
Sports-reference.com 1964 K-4 1000 m results.

Men's K-4 1000
Men's events at the 1964 Summer Olympics